Edgar Albert Hennig (January 9, 1897 – November 17, 1994) was a minor league baseball player and American football coach. He served as the head football coach at Texas Lutheran University in 1921, compiling a record of 3–0.

References

External links

1897 births
1994 deaths
Baseball pitchers
Austin Senators players
Palestine Pals players
Texas Lutheran Bulldogs football coaches
Tyler Trojans players
Texas State University alumni
People from Yorktown, Texas
Baseball players from Texas